Sergey Sergeevich Minaev (Russian: Серге́й Серге́евич Мина́ев, born January 25, 1975) is a Russian writer, radio- and TV-host, journalist and wine importer. He is known for his scandalous novels "ДухLess", "The Тёлки", "Media Sapiens".

Career
Minaev graduated the Russian State University for the Humanities at 1998. From 2008 to 2011 he worked on Radio Mayak and presented the broadcast "Танцы с волками" ("Dances With Wolves") and the show "Игры идиотов" (Games Of Idiots) on the Channel A One together with Igor Goncharov. From 2009 to 2012 he worked on the NTV channel and presented the telecast "Честный понедельник" ("Honest Monday"). From 2011 to 2013 he presented the internet show "Mинаев LIVE".

Bibliography
 2006 — "Дyxless. Повесть о ненастоящем человеке" (Soulless. The Story Of The Fake Man) (in 2012 the film adaptation was released)
 2007 — "Media Sapiens. Повесть о третьем сроке" (Media Sapiens. The Story Of The Third Term)
2007 — "Media Sapiens. Дневник информационного террориста" (Media Sapiens. The  Diary Of The Informational Terrorist)
2008 — "Время героев" (Time Of Heroes)
2008 — "The Тёлки. Повесть о ненастоящей любви" (The Bitches. The Story Of A Fake Love)
2009 — "Р.А.Б. Антикризисный роман" (S.L.A.V.E. Anti-crisis Novel)
2010 — "Videoты, или The Тёлки. Два года спустя" (Vidiots, Or The Bitches. Two Years Later)
2011 — "Москва, я не люблю тебя" (Moscow, I Don`t Love You)
2015 — "Духless 21 века. Селфи" (Soulless of the 21st century. Selfie). In 2018 the film adaptation was released

Personal life
Minaev has been married twice and has a daughter from his first marriage and son from his second.

Minaev was banned from the social media platform, Clubhouse, on February 21, 2021 after participating in a panel discussing feminism.(source?)

References

External links
 

Russian male writers
1975 births
Living people
Russian State University for the Humanities alumni
21st-century Russian writers
Russian television presenters
Russian radio personalities
Russian YouTubers
Russian podcasters